The Hispanic Organization of Latin Actors (HOLA) is an active arts service and advocacy organization founded in 1975. It is in the United States and is dedicated to Hispanic artists, actors and actresses. It is not to be confused with H.O.L.A., Helping Outstanding Latinos Achieve, a program winning numerous awards and grants and created in 2012 by Katelyn and Madison Singh; although both advocate for the success of Latino populations.

HOLA's Directory of Talent was created in 1981 and was the first directory to feature solely Latino talent. Currently, the online HOLA Talent Directory is the internet’s only concentrated pool of Latino acting talent.

The Hispanic Organization of Latin Actors (HOLA) is the United States’ longest running, active arts service and advocacy organization dedicated to expanding the presence of Hispanic artists in entertainment and media through the cultivation, education and recognition of emerging Latino artists. HOLA strives for an accurate, informed and non-stereotyped portrayal of the full spectrum of Latino culture and heritage in all entertainment and media industries.

Previous and current HOLA members include Fortuna Calvo-Roth, Carlos Carrasco (at one time the Executive Director), Pablo Andrade (current Executive Director), Míriam Colón, Liza Colón-Zayas, Delilah Cotto, Raúl Dávila (at one time its President), Caridad de la Luz, Robin de Jesús, Idalis DeLeón, Emilio Delgado, Venuz Delmar, Moisés Kaufman, Malcolm March, Ana Margarita Martínez-Casado, Jorge Merced, Olga Merediz, Antone Pagán, Ilka Tanya Payán, Antonia Rey, Daphne Rubin-Vega, Jaime Sánchez, Roselyn Sánchez, Jimmy Smits, Miguel Ángel Suárez, Judy Torres and David Zayas.

History

HOLA was founded in 1975 by a group of Hispanic actors (including founding president Ilka Tanya Payán and founding members Elizabeth Peña and Raúl Juliá) concerned with the images of Latinos in the media. The organization still functions as the nation’s leading advocacy group in the entertainment industry for actors working on stage, on television and in film. In one well-documented case in the 1990s, HOLA successfully collaborated with Actors’ Equity Association to shine a light on questionable casting practices being employed at the time on Broadway. The show in question then was the Ariel Dorfman play Death and the Maiden. Since that time the number of Latinos on Broadway has increased steadily over the years. HOLA was originally located in the west 40s in Manhattan. It later moved to the Lincoln Square Neighborhood Center in the West Side of Manhattan in the shadow of Lincoln Center. Since 2001, HOLA has been located in the Clemente Soto Vélez Cultural and Educational Center in the Loisaida section of Manhattan.

Activities
HOLA works within the entertainment industry to ensure that the Hispanic community has equal access to jobs while also functioning as a safe haven where Hispanic performers, writers and directors can share ideas, concerns and thoughts about the industry. Today, HOLA continues to provide essential services to professional actors. While show business has changed through the years, HOLA’s mission has remained the same. By expanding job opportunities for Hispanic actors, HOLA strengthens and supports the available talent pool for industry professionals seeking Latino acting talent.

HOLA Awards
Early in its history, the organization instituted an excellence in artistic achievement awards program (then called the H.O.L.A. Awards) that were held in the 1970s before being suspended. The HOLA Awards were held once again in 1999 and are currently held yearly.

HOLA Awardees have included well known artists such as Antonio Banderas, Rubén Blades, Danny Burstein, Bobby Cannavale, Nilo Cruz, Alfonso Cuarón, Benicio del Toro, Héctor Elizondo, Lupita Ferrer, Marlene Forte, Andy Garcia, Moises Kaufman, John Leguizamo, Bianca Marroquín, Lin-Manuel Miranda, Sara Montiel, Alfred Molina, John Ortiz, Pedro Pascal, Rosie Pérez, Daphne Rubin-Vega, Mercedes Ruehl, Felix Solis, Lauren Velez, and David Zayas.

Directory of Talent
The HOLA Directory of Talent was created in 1981 and was the first directory to feature solely Latino talent. Currently, the online HOLA Talent Directory is the internet’s only concentrated pool of Latino acting talent.

Programming

HOLA’s educational programming offers professional development and training for members and the Hispanic community. These are invaluable resources for artists to further develop their skills, gain practical experience and industry knowledge:

 HOLA MASTER CLASSES provide Hispanic and Latin actors opportunities to learn from industry professionals in theater, film, television, streaming media, and voice-overs to improve their skills. One popular recent class was “Movement for Actors and Singers” with Broadway performer, Gabriela Garcia. It is invaluable to meet with industry professionals for insights and networking which increases the opportunity for emerging artists to connect with established artists.
 HOLA WORKSHOPS are taught by industry experts to offer more expansive and deeper training for Hispanic actors to further prepare them for the challenges of the theater, media and entertainment industry. A popular HOLA workshop is the Spanish Language Voice Over Workshop with Manny Herrera. He has taught these workshops as a guest teacher for many years at HOLA.
 HOLA TALKS are lectures or conferences that discuss important information to members of our Latinx community in themes considered relevant for their careers and wellbeing.

HOLA is also focusing on diversity initiative programming that is dedicated to the advocacy for expansion in the presence and job opportunities of Latinx artists in theater, entertainment and media.

 HOLA PANELS create a space for debates on inclusion, empowerment and diverse aspects that concern the performing arts linked to a specific community within the great diversity of the Latinx culture in the United States.
 HOLA SPOTLIGHTS is a series of online conversations that highlight the diversity in the Latin and Hispanic talent and culture. One of these spotlights was with Ilda Mason, a dancer from the 2021 West Side Story remake who discussed her personal experience reaching the next level as an Afro-Latinx, woman actor in Hollywood.

Other current and past programs that HOLA has held over its long history include professional training units of workshops and seminars (HOLAfábrica), in-house casting referral service (HOLAgram), and a series of special events including networking events and HOLA After the Curtain series).

References

External links 
 
 Clemente Soto Vélez Cultural and Educational Center

Hispanic and Latino American professional organizations
1975 establishments in New York City